Cahir Castle, one of the largest castles in Ireland, is sited on an island in the river Suir. It was built from 1142 by Conchobar Ua Briain, King of Thomond. Now situated in Cahir town centre, County Tipperary, the castle is well preserved and has guided tour and audiovisual shows in multiple languages.

Construction
The castle was sited on and near an earlier native fortification known as a cathair (stone fort), which gave its name to the place. The core structure of the castle dates to construction in the 13th century by the O'Brien family. The castle was built in two parts, with the side now by the street being built 200 years before the side now housing the audio-visual show.

Granted to the powerful Butler family in late 14th century, the castle was enlarged and remodelled between the 15th and 17th centuries. It fell into ruin in the late 18th century and was partially restored in the 1840s. The Great Hall was partly rebuilt in 1840.

History
In 1375, the castle was granted to James Butler, newly created Earl of Ormond, for his loyalty to Edward III. His son James, the second Earl (by his second marriage) passed the lands around the barony of Iffa and Offa West to his children, though they were not themselves noble. This changed by 1542 when the first of the Barons Cahir was created. Unlike their Anglican kinsmen, this branch of the Butler dynasty sided with the Roman Catholic Irish in the Elizabethan wars. In 1599, the castle was captured after a three-day siege by the army of the Earl of Essex and was, for a year, put under the charge of Sir Charles Blount. Lord Cahir joined with the Earl of Tyrone in 1601 and was attainted for treason, but later obtained a full pardon. In 1627, the castle was the scene of a celebrated killing when Cahir's son-in-law, Lord Dunboyne, murdered his distant cousin, James Prendergast, in a dispute over an inheritance: he was tried for the killing but acquitted.

During the Irish Confederate Wars the castle was besieged twice. In 1647, George Mathew, the guardian of the young Lord Cahir, surrendered to Murrough O'Brien, 6th Baron Inchiquin (later 1st Earl, and a descendant of Cahir's builder) following his victory at the Battle of Knocknanauss. In 1650, he surrendered again to Oliver Cromwell, during his conquest of Ireland without a shot even being fired.

In 1961, the last Lord Cahir died and the castle became the property of the Irish state.

Protection and tourism

In the late 20th century the castle was named a National Monument, and is now managed by the Office of Public Works, who maintain the castle and operate tours.

The interior shots of the Abbey in the 1973 television film The Conflict, were filmed at the castle. In 1981, it was used as a location for a battle scene in the film Excalibur. In 1998, the site was used as a location for Saban's Mystic Knights Of Tir Na Nog on Fox Kids.

The castle was also used as a location for television series The Tudors. In 2021, it was used as a location for films The Green Knight and The Last Duel.

External links 
 Cahir Castle — official site

References

Cahir
National Monuments in County Tipperary
O'Brien dynasty
Historic house museums in the Republic of Ireland
Museums in County Tipperary
Castles in County Tipperary
Butler dynasty